Laddie Stupka (March 4, 1878 – February 20, 1946) was a United States Navy sailor and a recipient of the United States military's highest decoration, the Medal of Honor.

Biography
Stupka was born March 4, 1878, in Cleveland, Ohio and joined the Navy from Ohio. For his actions during the wreck he received the Medal of Honor December 26, 1903.

He died on February 20, 1946, and is buried in Baltimore National Cemetery Baltimore, Maryland.

Medal of Honor citation
Rank and organization: Fireman First Class, U.S. Navy. Born: 4 March 1878, Cleveland, Ohio. Accredited to: Ohio. G.O. No.: 145, 26 December 1903.

Citation: 

Serving on board the U.S.S. Leyden, for heroism at the time of the wreck of that vessel, 21 January 1903.

See also
List of Medal of Honor recipients during peacetime

References

External links

1878 births
1946 deaths
Military personnel from Cleveland
United States Navy sailors
United States Navy Medal of Honor recipients
Non-combat recipients of the Medal of Honor
Burials at Baltimore National Cemetery
People from Cleveland